Electronics cooling encompasses thermal design, analysis and experimental characterization of electronic systems as a discrete discipline with the product creation process for an electronics product, or an electronics sub-system within a product (e.g. an engine control unit (ECU) for a car). On-line sources of information are available and a number of books have been published on this topic.

Computer cooling is a sub-topic. Heat sinks are devices that are used to extend the surface area of electronic components available for air cooling, helping to lower the components case temperature. Fans are used to increase the air flow.

Thermal design and analysis is performed using hand calculations or spreadsheets, based on design rules or heat transfer correlations. Computer-aided engineering tools such as computational fluid dynamics are also used. Software for electronics cooling include Ansys' IcePak, Future Facilities' 6SigmaET, Daat Research Corp.'s Coolit and Siemens' Simcenter FloTHERM.

Simcenter FloTHERM. Is a commercial electronics cooling Computational Fluid Dynamic software for the modelling, simulation and analysis of printed circuit boards. FloTHERM was first released in 1989 by Flomerics (now Siemens Digital Industries Software).

References

Cooling technology